Saffire was an American video game developer based in South Jordan, Utah. Founded as Cygnus Multimedia Productions in 1993 by Les Pardew and Charles Moore, it was originally based in Pardew's basement in Orem with a team of six people. Pardew bought out Moore's share in 1994 and involved Hal Rushton as a partner in Moore's place. Cygnus was renamed Saffire in October 1995 and moved from Pleasant Grove to American Fork shortly thereafter for further expansion. Saffire became defunct in 2007.

History 
Saffire was founded by Leslie W. ("Les") Pardew with assistance by Charles Moore in 1993. The team initially consisted of six people working from Pardew's basement in Orem, Utah, and expanded to fourteen when it was incorporated in November 1993. The company was named Cygnus Multimedia Productions, taking the name from mythological king Cycnus of Liguria "because it sounded cool" and started out by creating artwork for video games of other developers.

In 1994, Pardew bought out Moore's stake in the company and brought on Hal Rushton, the former "vice president of product development" for Sculptured Software, as a partner. Rushton became the company's general manager, with Pardew as the president. By February 1995, Cygnus employed 50 people in a bottom-floor office in Pleasant Grove; the office was small, wherefore staff worked in shifts, and frequently flooded during rainfall. Cygnus changed its name to Saffire in October 1995 and moved to a new studio in the Utah Valley Business Park in American Fork later that year. The move allowed Saffire to engage in the full production of video games, which Pardew sought to fasten with continued expansion. To raise capital, Pardew borrowed  from Utah Technology Finance Corp. (UTFC) in September 1996 and further  in March 1997.

Rushton became the company's president by December 1997, while Pardew assumed the role of chief executive officer. Saffire settled in expanded offices in Pleasant Grove in January 1999. By that time, Mark Kendell had become the company's chairman. Saffire continued to expand, with 80 employees in December 1999 and 120 employees in July 2001, the latter while based in American Fork.

In March 2007, Saffire (at the time based in South Jordan) was developing Cryptid Hunter, then scheduled for release in 2008. However, Saffire went out of business later that year.

Games developed

References

External links 
  (archived)

1993 establishments in Utah
2007 disestablishments in Utah
American companies disestablished in 2007
American companies established in 1993
Defunct companies based in Utah
Defunct video game companies of the United States
Video game companies based in Utah
Video game companies disestablished in 2007
Video game companies established in 1993
Video game development companies